Samayapuram is a suburb of the city of Tiruchirappalli in Tamil Nadu, India. It is located 12 km north, from the heart of Tiruchirappalli, on the Trichy-Chennai highway. The Samayapuram Mariamman Temple, a prominent place of Hindu worship, is located here. Samayapuram kannanur ,mannachanallur taluk ,near governmanet hospital mannachanallur available other wise private hospital available here,samayapuram famous at trichirappali temple city

References 

 

Villages in Tiruchirappalli district